Ethan Robert Small (born February 14, 1997) is an American professional baseball pitcher for the Milwaukee Brewers of Major League Baseball (MLB). He made his MLB debut in 2022.

Amateur career
Small attended Lexington High School in Lexington, Tennessee. He was not drafted out of high school in the 2015 Major League Baseball draft, thus enrolling at Mississippi State University.

As a freshman at Mississippi State in 2016, Small pitched only ten innings. After the season, he played collegiate summer baseball with the Wareham Gatemen of the Cape Cod Baseball League. After his freshman campaign, he underwent Tommy John surgery and missed all of 2017. He returned as a redshirt sophomore in 2018, starting 18 games, going 5–4 with a 3.20 earned run average (ERA). In 2019, Small went 10–2 with a 1.93 ERA in 18 starts, striking out 176 batters in 107 innings, and was named the SEC Pitcher of the Year. He won the 2019 National Pitcher of the Year Award.

Professional career
Small was drafted with 28th overall pick by the Milwaukee Brewers in the first round of the 2019 Major League Baseball draft. He signed for $1.8 million. He made his professional debut with the Arizona League Brewers, and, after two games, was promoted to the Wisconsin Timber Rattlers. Over seven starts between the two teams, he went 0–2 with a 0.86 ERA, striking out 36 over 21 innings. He did not play a minor league game in 2020 due to the cancellation of the season.

Small began the 2021 season with the Biloxi Shuckers and was promoted to the Nashville Sounds during the season. That June, he was selected to play in the All-Star Futures Game. Over 18 starts in 2021, Small went 4–2 with a 1.98 ERA and 92 strikeouts over  innings.

Small was assigned to Triple-A Nashville to begin the 2022 season. On May 30, 2022, Small was selected to the 40-man roster and promoted to the major leagues for the first time to make a spot start against the Chicago Cubs.

Small was optioned to Triple-A Nashville to begin the 2023 season.

Pitching style
Small features a lively low- to mid-90 mph fastball—scouts often described it as a "rising" fastball—a curveball and changeup. He has been known to vary his windup timing on his pitches, to give him an advantage over hitters, similar to pitchers such as Marcus Stroman and Johnny Cueto.

References

External links

1997 births
Living people
People from Jackson, Tennessee
Baseball players from Tennessee
All-American college baseball players
Major League Baseball pitchers
Milwaukee Brewers players
Mississippi State Bulldogs baseball players
Wareham Gatemen players
Arizona League Brewers players
Biloxi Shuckers players
Nashville Sounds players
Wisconsin Timber Rattlers players
Arizona Complex League Brewers players
Leones del Escogido players